Kirkburn is a small village and civil parish in the East Riding of Yorkshire, England.

The civil parish is formed by the village of Kirkburn and the hamlets of Eastburn, Kelleythorpe and Southburn.
According to the 2011 UK census, Kirkburn parish had a population of 903, an increase on the 2001 UK census figure of 492.

History

The village was originally known as Westburn at the time of the Domesday Book and the name was changed to Kirkburn after the building of St Mary's Church in the village between 1130 and 1155. "Kirk" means "church".  The church was restored in the 19th century by John Loughborough Pearson and George Edmund Street. In 1966 the church was designated a Grade I listed building and it is now recorded in the National Heritage List for England and maintained by Historic England.
It is on the Sykes Churches Trail devised by the East Yorkshire Churches Group.

An important archaeological relic was found in 1987 during the excavation of a nearby Iron Age grave and dated to the 3rd century BC. The Kirkburn Sword, as it became known, is described by the British Museum as "probably the finest Iron Age sword in Europe". Its handle is made up of 37 pieces of iron, bronze and horn and decorated with red glass. Its scabbard is made of iron and polished bronze, decorated with a scroll pattern in La Tène style, with red glass studs and insets. They include an ornately decorated pair of linchpins from the axle.

From 1890 until 1954 Kirkburn was served by Southburn railway station on the Selby to Driffield Line.

See also
 Kirkburn Burial

References

External links

The British Museum describes the Kirkburn Sword
ChurchatKirkburn.org.uk - History and other matters relating to St. Mary's church in Kirkburn
"Kirkburn: Geographical and Historical information from the year 1892 (Bulmers')", Genuki.org.uk. Retrieved 16 April 2012

Villages in the East Riding of Yorkshire
Civil parishes in the East Riding of Yorkshire